M.Y.M.P. (or MYMP, short for Make Your Momma Proud) is an acoustic band from Quezon City, Philippines. They released their first album, Soulful Acoustic in 2003 and a double album, Beyond Acoustic which was a number six charting album, and number two charting album Versions in 2005, the two album was the best-selling album by an acoustic band having sold 285,700 album sales.

Background

Origin (1996–2002)
Jacques "Chin" Alcantara founded the band in 1996 as an amateur rock band.

The band transitioned to pop music when they had a female vocalist, Nina in 2000. When she left for a solo career a year later, Juris from Davao took her place.

Early career (2003–2004)
It was the trio of Alcantara, Juris Fernandez and percussionist Mike Manahan that established the beachhead for M.Y.M.P.’s frontal assault on the sales and radio charts.

Their recording career started when Raymond Ryan, the station manager of iFM 93.9, watched their gig on that station. Ryan met with a producer to produce their debut album, Soulful Acoustic. Ivory Music and Video then became their recording company. M.Y.M.P.'s debut album was released during the label's 20th anniversary. The band became famous with their original hit song "A Little Bit" (which won the People's Choice "Favorite Song" Award in Awit Awards 2004) and cover versions of Sting's "Every Little Thing" and Bob Marley's "Waiting in Vain".

The trio did click but M.Y.M.P. became a duo when one of their members decided to leave the group. Manahan left the band in mid-2004 due to what Alcantara called “professional differences” as well as a fallout from Manahan’s breakup with Fernandez; the two were in a relationship for a while. Yet, this did not stop M.Y.M.P.'s Juris & Chin from sharing their music, touring as a duo to promote their album.

Critical and commercial success (2005–2008)
The duo enjoyed their ride in the Philippine music scene as a new and improved M.Y.M.P. had emerged, a quartet together with Andrew and John as bassist and kahonista, respectively, as two more albums were released in a year. Versions and Beyond Acoustic, both 12-track albums. Beyond Acoustic debuted album number six on the Philippine Top Albums chart and was certified Gold after less than a month having sold 15,000 copies, to date the album had sold 210,700 copies in the Philippines making it the best-selling acoustic band album. They then recorded their double-disc 2nd album, Versions and Beyond Acoustic.

On October 1, 2005, MYMP had their first concert at the Music Museum, titled 'Especially For You'. The success of the concert prompted the band to hold its first major concert at the Araneta Coliseum on November 18, 2005, and a repeat on February 3, 2006. In December 2009. MYMP released their fourth studio-album New Horizon were it debuted at number three in Philippines, and was certified PARI Platinum with 30,000 copies sold. MYMP embarked on a US summer tour in 2006 and 2007.

In 2008, MYMP's contract with Ivory Music expired and signed a deal with Star Records, releasing their last album with Ivory Music, Now.

Departure of Juris Fernandez, label and lineup changes (2009–2018)
On November 5, 2009, Juris Fernandez was expelled from MYMP due to "irreconcilable professional differences". Contract disputes froze Chin and MYMP for 2 years, preventing them from recording outside Star Records, which was Juris' label. 

On January 24, 2010, Juliet Bahala was introduced as the new vocalist of M.Y.M.P. on ASAP. Bahala, then an 18-year-old regional singing champ, also came from Davao like its previous female vocalist. She sang on M.Y.M.P.'s second live album The Unreleased Acoustic Collection which was released in May 2011 under Galaxy Records. 

During the promotion of the album, Bahala suffered severe vocal fatigue, laryngitis and vocal nodules which eventually forced her to rest indefinitely. She was temporarily replaced by Vanessa Rangadhol from November 2011 to March 2013. Jana Laraza was later chosen via audition, and release the single "Electrified" and remained their vocalist until mid-2018.

Recent history (2018–present)
Carmella Ravanilla was chosen as vocalist in 2018. A few months earlier, MYMP returned to their original label, Ivory Music. The song "Wishes & Dreams" was released after almost 6 years of not recording new material. In July 2022, Juliet Bahala rejoined the group with Alyn Magadia until November 2002, then in January 2023, the group added 2nd female vocalist, with Ethyl Bahala, the sister of Juliet Bahala.

Blackface controversy
On October 30, 2020, MYMP went live on Facebook for a Halloween show with Chin Alcantara wearing blackface. In the session, the group stated that the Black Lives Matter movement was not to be supported and was propaganda, saying "All Lives Matter". This was met with tremendous backlash with over 11,000 comments on the live, with the majority denouncing MYMP's use of race as a costume.

Discography

 Soulful Acoustic (2003)
 Versions (2005)
 Beyond Acoustic (2005)
 New Horizon (2006)
 Now (2008)
 Electrified: 10th Anniversary Edition (2014)

Band members
Current members
 Chin Alcantara - Lead guitars and vocals
 Juliet Bahala - Vocals (2010–2011, 2022–present)
 Ethyl Bahala - Vocals (2023–present)
 Aaron Cadaing - Bass
 Benj Bamba - Drums

Past members
Fritz Ednacot (1996-1999)
Mark Esguerra (1996–1999)
Hannche Bobbis (1996-1999)
Ebet Ednacot (1996–2004)
Nina (2000–April 2001)
Juris Fernandez (2001–November 2009)
Mike Manahan (2003–July 2004)
Andrew Advincula (2004-2006)
John Angeles (2004-2009)
Emil Rives (2006-2009)
Oja Jimenez (2006-2009)
Jeff Lima (January 2010-2012)
Vanessa Rangadhol (November 2011–March 2013)
Jana Laraza (April 2013–September 2018)
Carmela Ravanilla (2018–2022)
Alyn Magadia (July 2022- November 2022)
Rodnie Resos (2018-2023)

Awards and nominations

References

External links
 Twitter
 MYMP Facebook
 MYMP Soundcloud
 Instagram

Filipino pop music groups
Musical groups established in 1996
Cover bands
PolyEast Records artists
Musical groups from Quezon City
Female-fronted musical groups